Mayhoola for Investments LLC is an investment entity incorporated under the laws of the State of Qatar, and located in Doha, Qatar.

Mayhoola is a Qatari investment fund that focuses on local and global investments. It is headquartered in the 36th Floor at Tornado Tower, West Bay.

Investments
Mayhoola Group has invested in fashion houses, including total ownership of Pal Zileri, Balmain, and  Valentino Fashion Group.

References

External links
Official page

Government-owned companies of Qatar
Economy of Qatar
Sovereign wealth funds
Finance in Qatar